Bang Phai is one of the ten subdistricts (tambon) of Mueang Nonthaburi District, in Nonthaburi Province, Thailand. Neighbouring subdistricts are (from north clockwise) Bang Si Mueang, Suan Yai (across the Chao Phraya River), Bang Kruai and Bang Si Thong. In 2020 it had a total population of 12,482 people.

Administration

Central administration
The subdistrict is subdivided into 5 administrative villages (muban).

Local administration
The whole area of the subdistrict is covered by Bang Phai Subdistrict Administrative Organization.

References

External links
Website of Bang Phai Subdistrict Administrative Organization

Tambon of Nonthaburi province
Populated places in Nonthaburi province